Somaliland vehicle registration plates allows the identification of vehicles registered in Somaliland. Current plates are used from 2005. Writing in black on a white background. Registration number on plate and name of state is written in the Latin and Arabic alphabets. Name of state in English is now in short from as "S.LAND".

History

Somaliland introduced their own vehicle registration plate in 1996. Number on plate and name of state was written in Latin and Arabic, but name of state in English was written "SOMALILAND". This form was replaced by 2005 series.

Special plates
 Government departments and offices of state: writing in white on a green background. Name of state in English is written "SOMALILAND" in 1996 version style.
 Foreign (humanitarian aid): writing in white on a red background. Name of state in English is written "S.LAND" in 2005 style.

External links
Somaliland on worldlicenseplates.com
License plates of Somaliland (www.matriculasdelmundo.com)

Somaliland
Somaliland-related lists